Frederick Horner may refer to:

 John Horner (British politician) (Frederick John Horner, 1911–1997), British firefighter, trade unionist and politician
 Frederick William Horner (1854–?), British playwright, publisher and Conservative politician